The 2013 Asia Women's Four Nations was the sixth edition of the competition. It was played as a knockout tournament, and was hosted at Almaty in Kazakhstan on the 4th and 7th of September. Kazakhstan won their fourth title, they met Japan in the final and narrowly edged them by 2 points, the score was 25–23.

Standings

Bracket

Results

Semi-finals

Third place

Final

References 

2013 in Asian rugby union
2013 in women's rugby union
Asia Rugby Women's Championship
Rugby union in Kazakhstan
Rugby union in Japan
Rugby union in Singapore
Rugby union in Hong Kong
Asia Rugby
Asia Rugby Women's Championship